Blask Szminki (Polish for glitter of a lipstick) is an album released by Polish punk rock band The Analogs.

Track listing
Titles in brackets are translated from Polish.
 "Blask Szminki" (Glitter of a lipstick)
 "Naiwne Dzieciaki" (Naive Kids)
 "Sny o Potędze" (Dreams of Power)
 "Hipisi w Martensach" (Hippies in Martens Boots)
 "Era Techno '99" (Techno Era '99)
 "Football '99"
 "Ukrzyżowani '99" (Iron Cross cover) (Crucified '99)
 "Niemy Krzyk '99" (Mute Shout '99)
 "Historia '99" (The History '99)
 "Gdzie Oni Są?" (Cock Sparrer cover) (Where are They Now?)
 "Inne Prawo Dla Nich" (The 4-Skins cover) (One Law For Them)
 "Max Schmeling (live)"
 "Te Chłopaki (live)" (Those Boys)
 "Oi! Mlodzież (live)" (Oi! Youth)

Personnel
Dariusz Tkaczyk - vocals
Ziemowit Pawluk - drums
Dariusz Stefański - guitar
Paweł Czekała - bass guitar
Błażej Halski - guitar
Grzegorz Król - guitar

Notes
Grzegorz took part in recording tracks 5-9.

External links
  The Analogs official website
  Jimmy Jazz Records

2000 albums
The Analogs albums
Rock'n'roller albums